This is a list of French television related events from 1974.

Events
 6 April – France's entrant Dani withdraws from the Eurovision Song Contest 1974 as a mark of respect due to the recent death of the French President Georges Pompidou

Debuts
 3 January – Le secret des Flamands (1974)
 6 May –  Nans le berger (1974)
 19 October – Histoires insolites (1974–1979)
 16 December –  Chéri-Bibi (1974–1977)
 21 December – The Tiger Brigades (1974–1983)

1950s
Discorama
Présence protestante (1955-)

1960s
La Tête et les Jambes (1960-1978)
Les Coulisses de l'exploit (1961-1972)
Les Dossiers de l'écran (1967-1991)
Monsieur Cinéma (1967-1980)
Les Animaux du monde (1969-1990)
Alain Decaux raconte (1969-1987)
Télé-Philatélie

Ending this year
 Arsène Lupin (since 1971)
 Aux frontières du possible (since 1971)

See also
1974 in France
List of French films of 1974